Xiuzhen "Susan" Cheng from the George Washington University, Washington, DC was named Fellow of the Institute of Electrical and Electronics Engineers (IEEE) in 2015 for contributions to localization and detection in sensor networks.

Education
Ph.D, University of Minnesota, 2002
M.S., University of Minnesota, 2000
B.S., National University of Defense Technology, 1991

References 

Fellow Members of the IEEE
Living people
George Washington University faculty
University of Minnesota College of Science and Engineering alumni
Year of birth missing (living people)
American electrical engineers